Lothar Brühne (19 July 1900 – 14 December 1958) was a German composer of film scores.

Selected filmography
 Lady Killer (1937)
 Diamonds (1937)
 La Habanera (1937)
 S.O.S. Sahara (1938)
 The Night of Decision (1938)
 The Blue Fox (1938)
 Five Million Look for an Heir (1938)
 Night of Fate (1938)
 Liberated Hands (1939)
 Der Stammbaum des Dr. Pistorius (1939)
 A Woman Like You (1939)
 Enemies (1940)
 What Does Brigitte Want? (1941)
 Beloved World (1942)
 Back Then (1943)
 Romance in a Minor Key (1943)
 Tonelli (1943)
 Come Back to Me (1944)
 Orient Express (1944)
 Long Is the Road (1948)
 The Lost Face (1948)
 Regimental Music (1950)
 The Man Who Wanted to Live Twice (1950)
 The Exchange (1952)
 Unter den Sternen von Capri (1953)
 I and You (1953)
 Regina Amstetten (1954)
 The Angel with the Flaming Sword (1954)
 Spring Song (1954)

External links

Musicians from Berlin
1900 births
1958 deaths
20th-century German composers